Pyongyang Gymnasium, also known as Pyongyang Indoor Stadium, is an indoor sporting arena located in Pyongyang, North Korea. The capacity of the arena is for 20,100 people and was opened in 1973. 

It is used to host indoor sporting events, such as basketball and volleyball, as well as concerts. Notable events held in the venue include a basketball match between the North Korea men's national basketball team and American former National Basketball Association players in 2014, and the 2003 mass games that featured in the 2004 documentary film A State of Mind.

References

External links

Indoor arenas in North Korea
Sports venues completed in 1973
Buildings and structures in Pyongyang
Basketball venues in North Korea
Volleyball venues in North Korea
1973 establishments in North Korea